S. carbonaria  may refer to:
 Scaphis carbonaria, an air-breathing sea slug species
 Schistura carbonaria, a ray-finned fish species

See also
 Carbonaria (disambiguation)